The Crucifixion: A Meditation on the Sacred Passion of the Holy Redeemer is an oratorio for a SATB choir and organ composed by John Stainer in 1887, with text by W J Sparrow Simpson. The piece relates the Biblical narrative of the Passion and Crucifixion of Jesus. It is particularly noted for the Christian hymn, All for Jesus, All for Jesus.

Composition

It is scored for a SATB choir and organ, and features solos for bass and tenor. Stainer intended the piece to be within the scope of most parish church choirs; it includes five hymns for congregational participation. The text was written by W J Sparrow Simpson, the librettist of Stainer's earlier cantata Mary Magdalene. The work is dedicated "to my pupil and friend W. Hodge and the choir of Marylebone Church", who first performed it on 24 February 1887, the day after Ash Wednesday. There have been performances in Marylebone Church annually since then.

The work premiered on 24 February 1887 and continues to be performed today. The oratorio has been recorded several times, including a popular recording released by RCA Victor in 1930, featuring Richard Crooks and Lawrence Tibbett.There is a modern (2016) recording by the Choir of St. Marylebone Parish Church with Thomas Allery (organ), conducted by Gavin Roberts.

Structure 

The oratorio consists of the following movements:
And They Came to a Place Named Gethsemane (tenor recitative) – text from Mark 14:32
The Agony (tenor and bass solo and chorus) – including text from Mark 14:46, 53, 60, 61–64, 15:1, 15–16
Processional to Calvary (organ solo) and "Fling Wide the Gates" (chorus and tenor solo)
And When They Were Come (bass recitative) – text from Luke 23:33
The Mystery of the Divine Humiliation (hymn)
He Made Himself of No Reputation (bass recitative) – text from Philippians 2:7–8
The Majesty of the Divine Humiliation tenor solo
And As Moses Lifted Up the Serpent (bass recitative) – text from John 3:14–15
God So Loved the World (chorus or quartet a cappella) – text from John 3:16–17
Litany of the Passion (hymn)
Jesus Said, 'Father, Forgive Them' (tenor and male chorus recitative) – text from Luke 23:34
So Thou Liftest Thy Divine Petition (tenor and bass solo duet)
The Mystery of the Intercession (hymn)
And One of the Malefactors (bass solo and male chorus) – text from Luke 23:39–43
The Adoration of the Crucified (hymn)
When Jesus Therefore, Saw His Mother (tenor solo and male chorus) – text from John 19:26–27, Matthew 27:45, Mark 15:34
Is It Nothing to You? (bass solo) – text from Lamentations 1:12
The Appeal of the Crucified (chorus)
After This, Jesus Knowing That All Things Were Now Accomplished (tenor and male chorus recitative) – text from John 19:28, 30, Luke 23:46
For the Love of Jesus (hymn)

Critical opinion
Some critics have expressed unfavourable opinions of Stainer's Crucifixion. The composer Ernest Walker dismissed the work, writing in 1924 that "Musicians today have no use for The Crucifixion". Edmund Fellowes said: "It suffers primarily from the extreme poverty, not to say triviality, of the musical ideas dealing with a subject which should make the highest demand for dignity of treatment". Kenneth Long said that Stainer had a libretto "which for sheer banality and naïveté would be hard to beat". Stainer himself characterised his work as "rubbish".  In his A Short History of English Church Music, Erik Routley traced The Crucifixion as the archetypal work that others imitated, and often diluted.

Other critics have viewed Stainer's work more sympathetically. Theologian Louise Joy Lawrence argues that, once the listener has set aside relative cultural views of Victorian "vulgarity", The Crucifixion serves well as a spiritual vehicle for conveying "theology and scripture at its most profound", and the melodies "as tools of glorification for God".

Howard E. Smither describes the piece as "the most important English work on the Passion". He observes that the work is structurally based on Johann Sebastian Bach's repertoire of Passions, with a Biblical narrative interspersed with choruses, solos and hymns reflecting on the Passion story, and also notes its popularity for Passiontide church performances throughout the English-speaking world.

Reviewing a recording of The Crucifixion in Gramophone (magazine), musicologist Jeremy Dibble referred to the piece's "rich, chromatic harmony", asserting that any accusations of "saccharine sentimentality" could be allayed by a sincere performance. He singled out the series of hymns for particular praise:

Contribution to hymnody
The final hymn in The Crucifixion, "For the Love of Jesus" also appears in modern hymnals; the hymn and its tune are both known by the first line, "All for Jesus, All for Jesus.

References

External links
Complete work available from the Choral Public Domain Library
Complete text available from the Choral Public Domain Library
Hawkins' arrangement of the work announced on ChoralNet
Coro Nostro Chamber Choir Recordings, featuring MP3 and OGG samples of  God so Loved the World
Appreciation & a review of SigCD176

1887 compositions
Oratorios
Compositions by John Stainer
Passion settings